The strict snake eel (Xyrias revulsus) is an eel in the family Ophichthidae (worm/snake eels). It was described by David Starr Jordan and John Otterbein Snyder in 1901. It is a marine, temperate water-dwelling eel which is known from the Indo-Pacific, including Japan, the Philippines, the China Sea, and South Africa.

References

Ophichthidae
Fish described in 1901
Taxa named by David Starr Jordan